Ubiquitin-related modifier-1 (URM1) is a ubiquitin-like protein that modifies proteins in the yeast ubiquitin-like urmylation pathway. Structural comparisons and phylogenetic analysis of the ubiquitin superfamily has indicated that Urm1 has the most conserved structural and sequence features of the common ancestor of the entire superfamily.

Urm1 is characterized by a core β-grasp fold and an essential carboxy terminal glycine within a di-glycine motif. Urm1 is known to be conjugated to the peroxiredoxin Ahp1, ATPBD3, and CTU2 and human MOCS3, through a mechanism involving the E1-like protein Uba4 via lysine residues. Similar to ubiquitination, urmylation requires a thioester intermediate and forms isopeptide bonds between Urm1 and its substrates. Moreover, the urmylation process can be significantly enhanced by oxidative stress. Functions as a protein tag with roles in nutrient sensing and oxidative stress response.

Recently it has been demonstrated that Urm1 can acts as a sulfur carrier in the thiolation of eukaryotic tRNA via a mechanism that requires the formation of a thiocarboxylated Urm1. URM1 is involved in thiolation of cytoplasmic tRNAs; receives sulfur from the E1-like enzyme Uba4 and transfers it to tRNA.
Sequence and structural homology studies suggest that Urm1 can be more closely linked to the prokaryotic sulphur transfer proteins, ThiS and MoaD, that can be considered as prokaryotic counterparts of the eukaryotic UBls.

See also 
Ubiquitin

References 

Post-translational modification
Proteins